The Latter Five Poets of the Southern Garden was a Ming dynasty poetry circle composed of Liang Youyu (梁有誉), Ou Daren (歐大任), Li Minbiao (黎民表), Wu Dan (吴旦), and Li Shixing (李时行). They are  generally considered to be the most important Cantonese poets of the sixteenth century.

See also
The Latter Seven Masters

References

Chinese poetry groups and movements
Ming dynasty
 Latter Five Poets of the Southern Garden